The Daughters of Rebekah, also known as the Rebekahs and the International Association of Rebekah Assemblies, is an international service-oriented organization and a branch of the Independent Order of Odd Fellows. Just like the Independent Order of Odd Fellows, the Rebekahs began as an all-white organization, as was typical at the time, that purports to promote the ethic of reciprocity and charity, and draws inspiration from Judeo-Christian ethics. 

The Independent Order of Odd Fellows originally limited membership to white men only, as was typical at the time. Thus, the Rebekahs began as the female auxiliary of the IOOF. Initially, only relatives such as wives or daughters of IOOF members were allowed. 

Currently, both IOOF and the Rebekahs allow both female and male members. Likewise, nowadays women need not be related to an Odd Fellow to be a member of the Rebekahs. As long as she meets the moral, ethical and age requirement for admission, any woman may join. In most jurisdictions, women aged 16 or 18 years old and above can join a Rebekah Lodge.

Philosophy and purpose
The general duties of the members of this unit are, “To live peaceably, do good unto all, as we have opportunity and especially to obey the Golden Rule, Whatsoever ye would that others should do unto you, do ye even so unto them.”

History
In 1850, Schuyler Colfax was tasked to write a Degree for women. The Rebekah Lodges were founded on 20 September 1851, when, after considerable debate, the Sovereign Grand Lodge of the Independent Order of Odd Fellows voted to adopt the Rebekah Degree, largely due to the efforts of Odd Fellow Schuyler Colfax, U.S. Vice President from 1869 to 1873. The first Rebekah Degrees were honorary awards only, conferred on wives and daughters of Odd Fellows at special Lodge meetings, and recipients were known as "Daughters of Rebekah". The name is taken from the Biblical character of Rebekah.

The early Daughters of Rebekah had no lodge system of their own, and operated in an informal and local manner.  On September 25, 1868, the IOOF voted to establish Degree Lodges of the Daughters of Rebekah, mirroring the existing arrangements for their male counterparts. The Daughters were given the right to elect their own officers, charge initiation fees, collect dues and undertake charitable and benevolent activities. The name was changed to "Degree of Rebekah" in 1874.

Teachings and symbolism
The Rebekah Degree was designed especially for women, and its ceremony and lectures are based upon the characters of notable women in Biblical history. It is named for that woman of early Hebrew history whose kindness and hospitality to a humble and unknown stranger was thought to best portray the nobility and character of women. There are also other notable women of Biblical history whose characters and virtues form the basis for the Rebekah Degree and lessons of life to be followed by the Rebekahs. They were famous for their loyalty, patriotism, for civic and national services, for humanitarianism, and for devotion to God and the cause of righteousness among mankind.

The Rebekah Degree ceremony is illustrated by distinctive symbols employed in the work of the degree, each having a significance and an appropriate application: 
 The beehive, a representation of cooperative industry teaching the advantages of united efforts in all the ministries of the order.
 The moon and seven stars represents the never failing order which pervades the universe of God and all of nature, and suggest to the members the value of system, regularity and precision in all worthy undertakings
 The dove, a universally recognized emblem of peace, has this significance in the Rebekah Degree. Through the mission of love and charity, of tolerance and forbearance, Rebekahs are to strive to bring happiness to others and to promote “Peace on earth and good will to men.”
 The lily, long regarded as the emblem of purity, is a symbol of the purity of character, of thought, of word, and of action which are aspired to in the hearts and lives of members of the Rebekah Lodge.

Rebekah Creed

"I am a Rebekah. I believe in the Fatherhood of God, the brotherhood of man and the sisterhood of women. I believe in the watch-words of our Order - Friendship, Love, and Truth. Friendship - is like a golden chain that ties our hearts together. Love - is one of our most precious gifts, the more you give, the more you receive. Truth - is the standard by which we value people. It is the foundation of our Society. I believe that my main concern should be my God, my family and my friends. Then I should reach out to my community and the world. For in God's eyes we are all brothers and sisters. I am a Rebekah!

Membership 
Originally membership was open to wives and daughter of Odd Fellows who had obtained the Scarlett Degree, as well as Odd Fellows of that degree themselves. In 1894, membership in the United States opened to white women, typical at that time, over 18, as well as wives, widows and daughters of Odd Fellows, although non-whites were able to join in other countries such as in Latin America and Australia. The African-American, Grand United Order of Odd Fellows, also have their own women's branch called the Household of Ruth. On January 1, 1898 there were 297,691 members of the Rebekah Degree. By 1923 it had grown to 1,021,297 members. In 1977 there were 331,844 members of the Rebekahs Assemblies, as well as 34,337 Odd Fellows who belonged to both orders. Odd Fellow and Rebekah lodges allow female and male members, but while both females and males may hold an Odd Fellow office, only females may hold the highest Rebekah offices

Organization 
Local units are called "lodges", of which there were 6,700 in 1979 in the United States and Canada.

Lodge officer positions

Theta Rho Girls Clubs 

Theta Rho girls Clubs are the junior order of the Rebekahs and are open to females ages 8–18 depending on jurisdiction. The clubs functions under the supervision of the Sovereign Grand Lodge of the Independent Order of Odd Fellows, who are superior in organizational authority to both the Rebekahs and the Theta Rhos. Membership was 14,150 in 1969 and 13,577 in 1970.

Rebekah Children's Services
Rebekah Children's Services is a public benefit corporation founded in 1897 by the California Rebekah Lodge as an orphanage. They now provide foster care placement and support services, parent support, prevention and early specific needs of the child and family whenever categorical services do not work. Their services include outpatient therapy,  education to the community, and behavioral health care services to children and families living in Santa Clara, Monterey and Santa Cruz counties.

Religious controversy 

Secular organizations were not widely acceptable at the time when the Rebekahs started. Because the Rebekahs was open to anyone regardless of religious affiliations, it met opposition from the clergy specially the Roman Catholic church which opposed the separation of the church and state politics. In 1907 the Apostolic Delegate to the United States, Diomede Falconio, in reply to a query from Novatus Benzing , OFM, of Phoenix, Arizona, determined that the Daughters of Rebekah, as well as the female auxiliaries of other condemned secret societies, fell under the same category of condemnation. However, permission for "passive membership" in female groups affiliated with societies condemned by the Church in 1894 (including the Masons, Odd Fellows, Knights of Pythias and Sons of Temperance) could be granted individually under certain conditions, viz. that the person in question had joined the group in good faith before the condemnation, that leaving the group would cause financial hardship due to the loss of sick benefits and insurance, that if permission was granted dues would only be paid by mail, the parishioner would not attend any lodge meetings, and the society would not have anything to do with the person's funeral.

Since 1975, however, several Catholic priests have become members of the Odd Fellows. One of them was Titian Anthos Miani who joined Scio Lodge No.102 of the Independent Order of Odd Fellows in Linden, California. As soon as the controversy declined and religious leaders began to accept secular organizations, numerous pastors, priests, bishops and rabbis from different religious sects have become members and some even held leadership positions in the Odd Fellows. Currently, membership represent various religious denominations from Catholics, Protestants, Muslims and others.

Today
Rebekah Lodges are still active in the United States despite the fact that the Odd Fellows Lodges in the United States and Canada now accept women as full members. In Europe and Latin America, however, the Rebekah Lodges are exclusively for women because the women choose to preserve the heritage while the Odd Fellow Lodges remain for men. In 2012, there were 77,468 active members belonging to 1,849 Rebekah Lodges located in the United States, Canada, Cuba, Chile, Hawaii, Mexico, Puerto Rico, Uruguay, Venezuela, and in Europe such as Estonia, Belgium, Czech Republic, Denmark, Finland, Germany, Norway, Netherlands, Spain, Sweden, and Switzerland.

Together with the Independent Order of Odd Fellows, Rebekahs undertake various community and charitable projects which include:
 The Odd Fellows and Rebekahs spend over US$7.5 million in relief projects annually
 The I.O.O.F. Educational Foundation provides substantial loans and grants to students
 SOS Children's Village provides a caring home for orphaned children in 132 countries around the world
 Odd Fellow and Rebekah Homes provide a caring environment for the elderly
 I.O.O.F. Living Legacy Program focuses on planting trees and enhancing the environment
 The Arthritis Foundation
 Visual Research Foundation supports vision care and research through the Wilmer Eye Institute
 Odd Fellows & Rebekahs Pilgrimage for Youth sponsors a group of students for an educational trip
 Annual pilgrimages to the "Tomb of the Unknowns" (Arlington National Cemetery, USA), Canadian War Memorial, Ottawa, ON, and other Tombs of the Unknown Soldier.
 Odd Fellow and Rebekah camps and parks provide recreation for the youth and for families

Notable Rebekahs
 Emma Eliza Bower (1852–1937) physician, club-woman, and newspaper owner, publisher, editor
 Julia Grant, first lady of the U.S. (1869-1877), wife of President Ulysses Grant
 Bertha Lund Glaeser (1862-1939), physician 
 Lucy Hayes, first lady of the U.S. (1877-1881), wife of President Rutherford Hayes
 Vernettie O. Ivy, for six years a member of the Arizona House of Representatives
 Clara C. Munson, first woman elected mayor in Oregon during the 19th century
 Jennie Phelps Purvis (d. 1924), writer, suffragist, temperance reformer 
 Doreen Patterson Reitsma, Wren in the Royal Canadian Navy
 Eleanor Roosevelt, first lady of the United States 
 Lucy Hobbs Taylor, first U.S. female dentist 
 Margaret Ray Wickens (1843-1918), president of the Kansas State Assembly of Rebekahs

References

External links 
 http://www.ioof.org
 Daughters of Rebekah cemetery symbol
 Rebekah jewels and pins

1851 establishments in the United States
Rebekah
Women's organizations based in the United States
Organizations established in 1851
Clubs and societies in Canada